Chisato Mishima is a retired professional fitness competitor from  Japan. To date she is the only fitness competitor from Japan to qualify and compete in both the Ms. Fitness Olympia and Ms. Fitness IFSB competitions. She lives and teaches yoga and coaches fitness in Japan.

Biography 

Chisato Mishima was born on November 17, 1967 in Nagoya, Japan She was a Japan national gymnastics champion during high school. After graduating from University she worked as a fitness coach for several professional baseball teams. She won the All Japan Aerobics competition in 1994 and 1995. Mishima moved to England in 1995 to train and compete in Europe. She won the British Championships in 1997.

Other notes

Mishima is a Jōdō Instructor at the Kaori-jiku Kobudo Dojo in Osaka, Japan.

References 

Fitness and figure competitors
Living people
Japanese sportspeople
1967 births
Sportspeople from Nagoya